Christopher Frank (5 December 1942, Beaconsfield, Buckinghamshire, UK – 19 November 1993, Paris, France) was a British-born French writer, screenwriter, and film director. He won the 1972 Prix Renaudot for his novel La Nuit américaine that served the basis for Andrzej Zulawski's film That Most Important Thing: Love.

Awards
1967: Prix Hermès de Littérature for Mortelle
1972: Prix Renaudot for La Nuit américaine

Works

Screenwriter
1974 Le Mouton enragé Michel Deville
1975 That Most Important Thing: Love Andrzej Zulawski
1977 Les Passagers Serge Leroy 
1977 Attention, les enfants regardent Serge Leroy 
1977 L'Homme pressé Édouard Molinaro 
1979 Memoirs of a French Whore Daniel Duval
1979 Clair de femme Costa-Gavras 
1980 Trois hommes à abattre Jacques Deray 
1981 Eaux profondes Michel Deville 
1981 Josepha Christopher Frank 
1981 Pour la peau d'un flic Alain Delon 
1981 Une étrange affaire Pierre Granier-Deferre 
1983 Le Battant Alain Delon 
1983 Femmes de personnes Christopher Frank 
1983 L'Année des méduses (Year of the Jellyfish) Christopher Frank 
1983 L'Ami de Vincent Pierre Granier-Deferre 
1986 Cours privé Pierre Granier-Deferre 
1987 Malone, un tueur en enfer Harley Cokeliss 
1987 Spirales Christopher Frank 
1993 Elles n'oublient jamais Christopher Frank

Dialogue
1980 Trois hommes à abattre by Jacques Deray
1981 Pour la peau d'un flic by Alain Delon

Film director

1982: Josepha
1984: Femmes de personne
1984: L'Année des méduses
1987: Spirale
1994: Elles n'oublient jamais

References

1942 births
1993 deaths
20th-century French non-fiction writers
British writers in French
French film directors
French male screenwriters
20th-century French screenwriters
People from Beaconsfield
People from South East England
Prix Renaudot winners
20th-century French male writers